Quararibea funebris (flor de cacao, cacahuaxochitl, funeral tree, rosita de cacao; syn. Lexarza funebris) is a tree native to Mexico. This plant is used as a medicinal plant, and also as one of the essential ingredients in the traditional chocolate-maize drink known as tejate. It is also depicted on Maya drinking vessels used for cacao.

References

External links

funebris
Trees of Mexico
Trees of Belize
Trees of Costa Rica
Trees of El Salvador
Trees of Guatemala
Trees of Nicaragua